Aldrin Davis (born August 2, 1969), professionally known as DJ Toomp, is an American record producer, songwriter, and DJ. DJ Toomp received his start in 1985, with Atlanta MC Raheem the Dream, producing Raheem’s self-titled record when he was only 16 years old. In the late 1980s, he was MC Shy-D's DJ and toured with him and the 2 Live Crew, as they performed at various venues across the country with other hip hop acts such as N.W.A. and Ice-T. After MC Shy-D left Luke Records, Toomp went on to DJ for JT Money and the Poison Clan. When the 2 Live Crew broke up he worked on an album with former group member Brother Marquis, called Indecent Exposure, under the moniker 2 Nazty; the cover billed him as a member of the Poison Clan. In 2006, Toomp partnered with hip hop veteran Bernard Parks, Jr., to launch NZone Entertainment, their very own record label.

DJ Toomp began to gain greater recognition by working with southern rapper T.I., who also hails from Atlanta, Georgia. They first worked together on T.I.'s 2001 debut I'm Serious, since then the two built a friendship and a work relationship, with him becoming T.I.'s main producer. Toomp was heavily involved in T.I.'s first four albums; together they brought trap music into the mainstream. Toomp then received critical acclaim in 2006, for producing T.I.'s hit single "What You Know", which peaked at #3 on the U.S. Billboard Hot 100, The song earned both Toomp and T.I. their first Grammy Award. In 2007, DJ Toomp was recruited by American rapper and fellow record producer Kanye West, to contribute production on his third album Graduation. Toomp, alongside West, co-produced the singles "Can't Tell Me Nothing" and "Good Life", as well as the album's outro "Big Brother", an ode to West's brotherly friendship with fellow American rapper Jay-Z.

Production work

References

External links
 
 

1969 births
Living people
20th-century American musicians
21st-century American musicians
African-American record producers
American hip hop DJs
American hip hop record producers
Grand Hustle Records artists
Musicians from Atlanta
Southern hip hop musicians
Trap musicians
Grammy Award winners for rap music
20th-century African-American musicians
21st-century African-American musicians